Tatsiana Piatrenia (also Tatyana Petrenya, born 18 October 1981) is a Belarusian trampoline gymnast, who has competed at four Olympic Games, with a best finish of fifth. She won the individual events at the 2017 Trampoline Gymnastics World Championships and the 2012 European Trampoline Championships.

Career
Piatrenia competed at the 2004, 2008, 2012 and 2016 Summer Olympics, making her the first female trampoline gymnast to compete at four Olympics. At the 2004 and 2008 Games, she did not reach the final of the women's individual event. In 2012, she won her event at the European Trampoline Championships, and finished fifth in the women's individual event in the Olympics. In 2015, Piatrenia won a bronze medal in the women's synchronized trampoline event at the Trampoline World Championships. In 2016, she reached the FIG World Cup final, finishing second in the women's individual event. She finished fifth in women's individual final at the 2016 Games, after having come first in the qualifying section of the event. In 2017, she won the women's individual event at the 2017 Trampoline Gymnastics World Championships, and came third in the women's synchronised trampoline event alongside Maryia Makharynskaya. She was part of the Belarus team that came second in the women's team event at the 2021 European Trampoline Championships.

Awards
In 2014, she was awarded the Master of Sport of Belarus by Belarusian President Alexander Lukashenko.  In 2017, she won the Belarus Female Sportsperson of the Year award.<ref

References

External links
 Sports Reference

1981 births
Living people
Belarusian female trampolinists
Gymnasts at the 2004 Summer Olympics
Gymnasts at the 2008 Summer Olympics
Gymnasts at the 2012 Summer Olympics
Gymnasts at the 2016 Summer Olympics
People from Mogilev
Olympic gymnasts of Belarus
Competitors at the 2009 World Games
Sportspeople from Mogilev Region
21st-century Belarusian women